The Hattiesburg Black Sox are a semi-professional baseball team located in Palmer's Crossing, outside Hattiesburg, Mississippi. The team started in 1941 by Milton Barnes as part of the independent Negro leagues. It was not until the mid-1980s that Barnes made the decision to integrate the team. In 1993, Barnes made a call to Trey Aby, who at the time was a catcher with William Carey College.

After years of playing for the Sox, Barnes decided it was time to pass the torch to Aby. In 2003, Aby purchased the Hattiesburg Black Sox for an undisclosed amount. During the first season under Aby's leadership, the team had an outstanding record of 41-7, but finished last in the NSPBA World Series held in Evansville, Indiana. In 2004, the Sox went 57-6 and came in runner-up at the NSPBA World Series in Evansville, Indiana. In 2005, the Sox were 59-5, winning the NSPBA World Series. In 2006, the Black Sox finished 59-6, winning the Disney Classic held at the Wide World of Sports Complex in Orlando, Florida.

In 2007, Hattiesburg Black Sox stepped it up, capturing various titles. The team won the 2007 MJMBL League - in early July.
Then on July 28, they won the ASPBA World Series (aluminum bat). One week later, the same guys won the NSPBA World Series (wood bat) thereby becoming the first team to win both a wood bat and aluminum bat title in the same year.

The Black Sox have won the Mississippi Baseball Congress Semi Pro Tournament 7 times: 2008, 2009, 2011, 2016, 2018, 2019, 2020.

The Black sox have won 12 Magnolia Baseball League Titles : 2005-2011, 2013, 2016-2019

External links
 Team's website
 Hattiesburg American website 
 Hattiesburg American website article 
 Hattiesburg American website article

Hattiesburg, Mississippi
Negro league baseball teams
Semi-professional sports teams
Defunct baseball teams in Mississippi